Esmailiyeh-ye Do (also Romanized as Esmā‘īlīyeh-ye Do; also known as Esmā ‘Eynī, Esmā‘īlīyeh, and Ismaun) is a village in Muran Rural District, in the Soveyseh District of Karun County, Khuzestan Province, Iran. At the 2006 census, its population was 615, in 130 families.

References 

Populated places in Karun County